Adick Koot (born 16 August 1963) is a Dutch former professional footballer who played as a central defender.

He started his 18-year career with PSV, then spent its remainder in France, mainly at the service of Cannes.

Club career
Born in Eindhoven, Koot joined PSV Eindhoven in 1982 at the age of 18. After only one Eredivisie game in his first two seasons combined, he proceeded to be regularly used as the club won five national championships and three domestic cups.

During his nine years with the PSV, Koot appeared in more than 150 official games. He was an unused substitute in the 1987–88 European Cup final, won against S.L. Benfica on penalties.

In the 1991 summer Koot joined AS Cannes in France, being relegated from Ligue 1 in his first year but gaining immediate promotion back. In the 1997–98 campaign, he acted as player-coach (21 matches, one goal) as the French Riviera team was again relegated; he played in 220 competitive matches during his tenure.

35-year-old Koot signed for another side in Ligue 2, Lille OSC, for 1998–99, only missing on promotion due to goal difference. He retired at the end of the season, and became a sports agent.

International career
Koot gained three caps for Holland, in one year. His debut was on 23 March 1988, as he played seven minutes in a 2–2 friendly draw in England.

Honours
PSV
European Cup: 1987–88
Eredivisie: 1985–86, 1986–87, 1987–88, 1988–89, 1990–91
KNVB Cup: 1987–88, 1988–89, 1989–90

References

External links

1963 births
Living people
Footballers from Eindhoven
Dutch footballers
Association football defenders
Eredivisie players
PSV Eindhoven players
Ligue 1 players
Ligue 2 players
AS Cannes players
Lille OSC players
Netherlands youth international footballers
Netherlands international footballers
Dutch expatriate footballers
Expatriate footballers in France
Dutch expatriate sportspeople in France
Dutch football managers
Ligue 1 managers
AS Cannes managers